Kacper Skibicki (born 11 October 2001) is a Polish professional footballer who plays as a midfielder for GKS Tychy, on loan from Legia Warsaw.

Career

On 8 November 2020, he made his Legia Warsaw debut in a 2–1 victory over Lech Poznań, and scored his first goal for the club.

On 4 January 2023, he joined I liga side GKS Tychy on a six-month loan with an option to buy.

Honours
Legia Warsaw
Ekstraklasa: 2020–21

References

External links

2001 births
Living people
Polish footballers
People from Chełmno
Association football midfielders
Poland youth international footballers
Olimpia Grudziądz players
Legia Warsaw II players
Legia Warsaw players
GKS Tychy players
Ekstraklasa players
II liga players
III liga players